Hopeville Pond State Park is a public recreation area located on Hopeville Pond, an impoundment of the Pachaug River, in  the town of Griswold, Connecticut. A portion of the  state park occupies the site of the lost village of Hopeville. The park manager's house occupies Avery House, which is listed on the National Register of Historic Places. The park offers fishing, swimming, camping, and trails for hiking and biking. It is managed by the Connecticut Department of Energy and Environmental Protection.

History 
Before European colonization, the Mohegan people constructed stone weirs to harvest fish from the Pachaug River. The weirs directed water flow and fish to the center of the stream for easy capture in fishing baskets. 
Village
In 1711, Stephen Gates was granted 14 acres of land lying within the modern state park's boundaries. Gates constructed a gristmill and sawmill, inundating the waterfall on the Pachaug River in the process. In 1818, Elizah Abel added a woolen mill to the site. Later, John Slater purchased the three mills and constructed a satinet mill which he named the "Hope Mill," the village, pond and state park names all having subsequently derived from his inspiration.

By 1840, Hopeville was a "thriving village" according to Daniel L. Phillips, author of Griswold - a history. On November 4, 1850, a meeting was held to discuss the construction of a house of worship. A church was erected for $1,700 and dedicated on December 12, 1852. The village of Hopeville reached its peak in 1860 and was well known for its production of woolens. In 1881, the mill, then owned by Edwin Lanthrop and Company, was destroyed in a fire and not rebuilt. The Ashland Cotton Company would later acquire the property. In 1900, the church and four houses also burned. In 1908, the original gristmill from 1711 was also destroyed by fire. Sometime before 1917, the Ashland Cotton Company erected a dam on the site and created the 145 acre reservoir; the dam was used to generate electrical power for its mills in Jewett City.

Avery House

The central chimney is on a stone base and has a built-in root cellar. In 1935, the Civilian Conservation Corps (CCC) rehabilitated the property for park use. The alterations in the house changed the traditional five-room first floor plan by eliminating the keeping rooms and the removal of the kitchen fireplace. It retains much of its original door frames and wrought-iron latch hardware. After the rehabilitation of the property, the Avery House became the Hopeville Park manager's residence. It was listed on the National Register of Historic Places in 1986.

Park
The Civilian Conservation Corps, encamped in nearby Pachaug State Forest, developed the state park in the 1930s. Their efforts included adapting the Avery House for park use. Hopeville Pond was designated as a state park in 1938.

Activities 
The park's recreational activities include biking, hiking, camping, fishing, boating, and swimming.  The park's campground features 80 campsites. Fish found in  Hopeville Pond include channel catfish, northern pike, largemouth bass, chain pickerel, and yellow perch.

Hopeville Pond was included in an 11-mile bike trail in Connecticut: Rides for the Casual Cyclist. The Lake Lubbers website states that Hopeville Pond is a popular location for fishing, including ice fishing. The reported fish include "northern pike, largemouth bass, smallmouth bass, catfish, chain pickerel, yellow perch, and bluegill". The park's camp site received a positive mention in 2013 in Best Tent Camping: New England.

References

External links
Hopeville Pond State Park Connecticut Department of Energy and Environmental Protection
Hopeville Pond State Park Map Connecticut Department of Energy and Environmental Protection

State parks of Connecticut
Parks in New London County, Connecticut
Protected areas established in 1938
1938 establishments in Connecticut
Griswold, Connecticut
Civilian Conservation Corps in Connecticut